Bournemouth, Christchurch and Poole Council is a unitary authority in Dorset, England. It was formed in April 2019, with the inaugural elections held in May of that year. The council is made up of 76 councillors from 33 wards, elected for a four-year term, with the next elections due take place in 2023.

Political control 
After the 2019 Election no party was in overall control, with the Conservatives 3 seats short of a majority, with a "Unity Alliance" coalition, led by the Liberal Democrats instead forming a majority administration. In 2020, a vote of no confidence lead to the Conservatives forming a minority administration. In September 2021, 4 councillors, 3 independents and 1 Liberal Democrat, defected to the Conservatives, forming a majority on the council for the first time since its first election in May 2019.

Leadership
The leaders of the council since 2019 have been:

Result maps

Council elections 

 2019 Bournemouth, Christchurch and Poole Council election

By-election results

2021 
Two by-elections were held in May 2021 alongside national local elections after the death of a Liberal Democrat and an Independent councillor in the wards of Canford Heath and Commons.

Canford Heath

Commons

References 

Bournemouth, Christchurch and Poole elections
Politics of Bournemouth, Christchurch and Poole
Council elections in Dorset
Unitary authority elections in England